Yasnohirka is an urban-type settlement in Kramatorsk Raion in Donetsk Oblast of eastern Ukraine. Population:

Demographics
Native language as of the Ukrainian Census of 2001:
 Ukrainian 61.36%
 Russian 38.05%
 Armenian 0.42%
 Belarusian 0.07%
 German 0.02%

References

Urban-type settlements in Kramatorsk Raion